The Seville was manufactured by Cadillac from 1975 to 2004 as a smaller-sized, premium model. It was replaced by the STS in 2004.

Origin of the name

The name of "Cadillac's first small car" was selected over a revival of LaSalle or the GM design staff's preference, LaScala, primarily because, as noted by GM Marketing Director Gordon Horsburgh, "It had no negatives." The initial suggestion was "Leland" in honor of one of the make's founders but it was rejected because most buyers wouldn't understand the reference and Henry Leland had also founded rival Lincoln.

Hundreds of suggestions were considered: after extensive research, LaSalle was the top pick with St. Moritz a distant second, trailed further by Seville. A troubled past (Lasalle) and difficult pronunciation (St.Moritz) led to selection of the Seville nameplate.

Seville is the name of a Spanish province and its capital, renowned for its history and treasures of art and architecture. Cadillac had first used the nameplate for a two-door hardtop version of the 1956 Eldorado. 1960 was the last model year for the Eldorado Seville, returning in 1967 under a different name.

First generation (1976–1979) 

The Seville, introduced in May 1975 as an early 1976 model, was Cadillac's answer to the rising popularity of European luxury imports as Mercedes-Benz, Audi and BMW. GM planners were becoming concerned that the division's once-vaunted image as the “standard of the world" was fading, especially among the younger generation of car buyers.

Over time, European luxury cars had become quite luxurious and even more expensive than the much larger Cadillacs. As market share of these imports continued to climb, it became obvious that the traditional American automotive paradigm of "bigger equals better" had begun to falter. The Seville became the smallest and most expensive model in the lineup, turning Cadillac's traditional marketing and pricing strategy upside down and also partially succeeding the Calais as the "smallest, Chevrolet-based Cadillac". Full size design prototypes were created as early as winter of 1972–73 (wearing the tentative name LaSalle, reviving the Cadillac junior brand from 1927 to 1940). Subsequent design prototypes looked edgier (specifically a 1973 named LaScala which forwardly hinted at the 1992 Seville).

Styling took strong cues from the Rolls-Royce Silver Shadow. Unibody construction included a bolt-on subframe with a rear suspension based on the rear-wheel drive 1968–74 X-body platform that underpinned the Chevrolet Nova. It also featured a rear differential with thicker front subframe bushings similar to the second generation F platform used in the Camaro, Firebird, and the 1975–79 X-body platform.  Substantial re-engineering and upgrades from these humble origins earned it the unique designation "K-body" (rather than "X-special" following the format of the A-special Chevrolet Monte Carlo/Pontiac Grand Prix and B-special Buick Riviera).

Also shared with the X-body platform was part of the roof stamping and trunk floor pan (for 1973 and newer vehicles). Cadillac stylists added a crisp, angular body that set the tone for GM styling for the next decade, along with a wide track stance, giving the car a substantial, premium appearance. A wide chrome grille flanked by quadruple rectangular headlamps with narrow parking and signal lamps just below the header panel, while small wrap-around rectangular tail lamps placed at the outermost corners of the rear gave the appearance of a lower, leaner, and wider car. The taillight design was similar to that used on a rejected Coupe DeVille concept.

Seville engineers chose the X-body platform instead of the originally-intended to be used German Opel Diplomat in response to GM's budget restrictions—executives felt re-engineering an Opel would be more costly. Another proposal during development was a front-wheel drive layout similar to the Cadillac Eldorado. This proposal was also rejected because of budget concerns since the transaxle used for the Eldorado was produced on a limited basis solely for the E-body (Eldorado/Toronado) and the GMC motorhome of the mid-1970s.

Introduced in mid-1975 and billed as the new "internationally-sized" Cadillac, the Seville was almost  lighter than the full-sized Deville. The Seville was thus more nimble and easy to park, as well as retaining a full complement of Cadillac features. More expensive than any other Cadillac (except the Series 75 Fleetwood factory limousines) at US$12,479 ($ in  dollars ), the Seville was modestly successful. It spawned several imitators including the Lincoln Versailles and the Chrysler LeBaron (Fifth Avenue after 1982). To ensure the quality of the initial production run, the first 2,000 units produced were identical in color (Georgian silver) and options. This enabled workers to "ramp up" to building different configurations. Total 1976 Seville production was 43,772 vehicles.

Early Sevilles produced between April 1975 (a total of 16,355) to the close of the 1976 model year were the first Cadillacs to use the smaller GM wheel bolt pattern (5 lugs with a  bolt circle; the 2003–2009 XLR also uses this pattern). The first Sevilles shared a minority of components with the X-Body. The rear drums measured  and were similar to the ones used with the Nova 9C1 (police option) and A-body (Chevelle, Cutlass, Regal, LeMans) intermediate station wagons. Starting with the 1977 model year, production Sevilles used the larger 5-lug bolt circle common to full-size Chevrolet passenger cars (1971–76), Cadillacs, Buicks, Oldsmobiles, Pontiacs, and half-ton Chevrolet/GMC light trucks and vans. It also received rear disc brakes, a design which would surface a year later as an option on the F-body Pontiac Trans Am. 1975–76 models included a vinyl roof, to less expensively cover the roof's two part construction, the rear section around the C-pillar was pressed especially for Cadillac and X-body pressing was used for the forward section. Due to customer demand, a painted steel roof was offered in 1977, requiring a new full roof stamping. 1977 Seville production increased slightly to 45,060 vehicles.  The last year, production increased to the first generation's peak production, at 56,985.

The engine was an Oldsmobile-sourced  V8, fitted with a Bendix/Bosch electronically controlled fuel injection. This system gave the Seville smooth drivability and performance that was usually lacking in domestic cars of this early emissions control era. A diesel  LF9 V8 was added in 1978, a first in an American passenger vehicle.

For model years 1978–1979, the Seville offered a trip computer, marketed as Tripmaster at an extra cost of $920. It replaced the two standard analogue gauges with an electronic digital readout for the speedometer and remaining fuel. It also replaced the quartz digital clock with an LED version. The trip computer performed various calculations on a small panel to the right of the steering wheel, including miles to empty, miles per gallon and destination arrival time (which needed to be programmed by the driver, to estimate arrival time based on miles remaining). Though preceded by the British 1976 Aston Martin Lagonda sedan, the Seville was the first American automobile to offer full electronic instrumentation.  Although the 1978 Continental Mark V was available with a "Miles-To-Empty" feature (i.e., an LED readout of miles left to travel based on the fuel remaining), Lincoln did not offer full electronic instrumentation until 1980. The trip computer proved an unpopular option and was rarely ordered. A digital instrument cluster was not available on the Seville and Eldorado again until 1981. Although this feature itself was no longer available, the new electronic fuel data system introduced in 1980, as well as the new electronic heating and air conditioning controls, replaced some of the trip computer functions.

A number of custom coach builders made modifications to the 1975–1979 Seville, including shortened 2-seat 2-door convertibles, a 2-door convertible with a back seat, a 2-door pickup truck, 2-door coupes, 2- and 4-door lengthened-hood Sevilles with a fake spare tire in each front fender, and a lengthened-wheelbase standard 4-door Seville.  In the late 1970s, Florida coachbuilder, Grandeur Motor Car Company, offered converted Sevilles with neoclassical 1930s styling cues. These sedans were converted into 2-door coupes with an elongated hood, fake spare tire covers on both sides, a small portal window in the rear right section of the vinyl-covered roof, and an upright Rolls-Royce-like grille. An estimated 600 Seville Opera Coupes were produced.

The Seville was manufactured in Iran under the brand name of "Cadillac Iran" from 1978 to 1987 by Pars Khodro, which was known as "Iran General Motors" before the Islamic Revolution. A total of 2,653 Cadillacs were made in Iran during this period. This made Iran the only country assembling Cadillacs outside the US until 1997 when the Opel Omega-based Catera was built in Germany for US sale. The Cadillac BLS, built in Sweden exclusively for European market, was introduced in 2006. Although the Allanté had an Italian-sourced body and interior, its final assembly was done in the US.

Seville Elegante 

From 1978, through the third generation in 1988, the Seville was available with the Elegante package. It added a unique black/silver two-tone exterior paint combination and perforated leather seats in light gray only. Real wire wheels were standard as were a host of other features which were optional or unavailable on the base Seville.

In 1979, a second color combination was added, a two-tone copper shade with a matching leather interior. For the second generation Elegante in 1985, a monotone paint combination became available; however, dual-shade combinations, later available in various colors, remained more popular. The price for this package increased over time from $2,600 in 1978 ($ in  dollars ) to $4,005 ($ in  dollars ) in 1987 in addition to the base price.

Production

Engines

Second generation (1980–1985) 

While the first-generation Seville had proved quite successful, it failed in its primary mission of winning over younger import buyers.  Marketing research indicated that the car was most popular with older women who wanted a Cadillac in a smaller, more maneuverable size. For the 1980 model year, the Seville's K-body platform became front-wheel drive, based on the E-body Eldorado, Buick Riviera, and Oldsmobile Toronado. Length and wheelbase were similar, with the car losing 0.3" in wheelbase and gaining 0.8" overall. The new model featured independent rear suspension and was the first American car to have a standard diesel engine, carried over from the previous generation. Cadillac's new  L62 V8 with Digital Fuel Injection was a no-cost option except in California, where the fuel-injected Oldsmobile 350 remained available as a no-cost option.

The razor-edged bustle-back rear styling drew inspiration from English coachbuilder Hooper & Co.'s "Empress Line" designs from the early 1950s, which were considered a dramatic, modern take on the mid-'30s style of trunk/body integration. In addition, long hood/short deck proportions were inspired by luxury cars of the 1960s. The Seville's "statement" styling was one of the last vehicles designed by Bill Mitchell, appointed by Harley Earl in 1936 as the Cadillac's first chief designer. It was swiftly imitated by the 1982–87 Lincoln Continental sedan and the 1981–83 Imperial coupe.  Sales were strong at first, but disastrous flirtation with diesel engines and the ill-fated V-8-6-4 variable displacement gasoline engine, coupled with poor quality control eroded Seville's standing in the marketplace.

The Seville introduced features that would become traditional in later years. In 1981, memory seats appeared—a feature not seen on a Cadillac since the Eldorado Broughams of the late 1950s. This option allowed two stored positions to be recalled at the touch of a button. Also new for 1981 was a digital instrument cluster. The "Cadillac Trip Computer" was a precursor to this option in 1978. Available until 1985, it was considerably less expensive than the trip computer and featured just a digital speedometer and fuel gauge. Engine options changed for 1981: the V8 was now equipped with the V8-6-4 variable displacement technology. However, the engine management systems of the time proved too slow to run the system reliably. A  Buick V6 was added as a credit option. Puncture-sealing tires were also new.

In 1982, Seville offered heated outside rear-view mirrors with an optional rear defogger. Inside, a "Symphony Sound" stereo cassette tape system was available. The previously standard diesel engine became an option with the introduction of a new  HT-4100. This engine had a number of reliability issues, such as weak, porous aluminum block castings and failure-prone intake manifold gaskets.

For 1983, the Buick V6 was dropped and a new "Delco/Bose" stereo cassette system was offered at $895. Initially looking like a standard Delco radio, from 1984 onward it featured a brushed gold-look front panel and bulbous lower interior door speaker assemblies. This was also the last year for an available 8-track stereo system. From 1983 through 1985, it was available with a fake cabriolet roof option which gave the appearance of a four-door convertible.

Production Figures:

Engines 

In 1980, the 350 ci L49 was only available for California.

Third generation (1986–1991) 

The Seville's computerized engine management system featured a BCM/ECM (Body Control Module/Engine Control Module) and an electronic dashboard using high-intensity vacuum fluorescent displays — made possibly after GM's acquisition of Hughes Electronics.

With sales substantially below expectations, Cadillac facelifted the exterior for model year 1988. This was the final generation to have annual facelifts of the grilles. Cadillac introduced the Seville Touring Sedan (STS) trim level this model year, equipped with the FE2 touring suspension, 15-inch alloy wheels, upgraded springs, a rear sway bar, a 15.6:1 steering ratio for enhanced handling, grille mounted emblem, cloisonne trunk lock cover, and a four-passenger interior. Seville Touring Sedan production totaled 1,499 units in 1988. The first 1988 STSs were custom built by Cars and Concepts and announced at that year's Detroit Grand Prix.  These initial run models were available to VIPs within General Motors, the Cadillac Division, some major shareholders and a short list of dignitaries.  A special label was affixed to the lower corner of the driver-side front door identifying it as one of the original STSs. The Elegante trim package, first introduced on Seville in 1978, was discontinued after the 1988 model year.

For 1989, the first production STSs were sold as a "Limited Edition" with option code of YP6. Features from the 1988 model were carried over with the addition of a retuned suspension package for more precise steering and firmer feel of the road. Additional features included hand-stitched beechwood ultrasoft leather seats, anti-lock braking, touring suspension, a 3.3:1 drive ratio, 15-inch cast aluminum alloy wheels, and Goodyear Eagle GT4 blackwall tires.

The additional STS features were: grille with flush-mounted wreath-and-crest, modified driver's front fender with the cornering light moved to the front fascia and headlight monitors removed, matching body-color front lower airdam and bodyside moldings, matte black export license pocket with bright bead, matte black front bumper impact pads and rear bumper guard vertical inserts, matching body color outside rearview mirrors with a black patch, modified (from Eldorado) rear reflexes (moved to the bumper), modified export taillamps with three-color European-style lenses, an STS nameplate on the deck lid, and an STS-exclusive cloisonne deck lid lock cover.

The STS interior had a 12-way power front seat, manual articulating front seat headrests, center front armrest with cassette and coin/cup storage console trimmed in ultrasoft leather, netted map pockets, rear bucket seats with integral headrests, center rear console and rear storage compartment, leather-wrapped front and rear door trim panels, door pull straps and overhead pull straps, high-gloss elm burl real wood appliques on door trim panels and switch plates, horn pad and bar, instrument panel and front and rear consoles, Beechwood Thaxton floor carpet and a decklid liner in tara material with STS logo. Other standard STS features included automatic door locks, illuminated driver and passenger side visor vanity mirrors, illuminated entry system, rear window defogger, a theft-deterrent system, and trunk mat.

Only four exterior colors were available for the STS this year: White Diamond, Sable Black, Black Sapphire, or Carmine Red. 1,893 Seville Touring Sedans (STS) were produced for the 1989 model year. The first models were leftovers from the Cars and Concepts run of the 1988 production year with the special sticker located on the lower part on the inside of the driver's door. These were produced prior to December 1988 for the 1989 production year and are rare. The last 6 digits of these VIN numbers would be below 808000. As with the 1988 model, a special 3.25" x 2" black/silver chrome label was affixed to the lower inside area of the driver-side front door by Cars and Concepts identifying it as one of the original STS models.

In 1990, the Seville got a new fuel injection system which brought the horsepower up to 180. Front park lamps were no longer mounted in the fender on any Cadillac but the STS was further modified. New side and rear body color fascias gave the car a sportier, more aggressive look. Also added was dual exhaust with bright stainless outlets, a larger STS trunk script, standard Teves anti-lock braking system with rear discs, and 16-inch machine finished alloy wheels on Goodyear Eagle GT+4 tires. A driver's side airbag was also added to Seville and STS. While the engine was the same as used in regular Seville models, the transmission had a special final drive ratio of 3.33:1 for better acceleration. The 1990 STS also received its own body designation of 6KY69 and prices started at $36,320. 1990 STS production totaled 2,811 vehicles.

There were no body changes in 1991 but there was a new 4.9-liter V8 under the hood coupled to a 4T60E electronically controlled transmission. The new V8 no longer used the A.I.R. system and additional refinements to the internals brought the horsepower up to 200. The only change to the STS was the removal of the rear bucket seats for a full-width bench and new front seats with larger side bolsters taken from the prior year's Eldorado Touring Coupe. 2,206 were produced.

Production Figures:

Engines

Fourth generation (1992–1997) 

For 1992, Cadillac delivered a new, European-flavored Seville with positive reviews from both car magazines and customers. The Seville Touring Sedan was Motor Trend magazine's Car of the Year for 1992. It also made Car and Driver magazine's Ten Best list that year.  The Seville STS adopted styling cues from the 1988 Cadillac Voyage concept car.

The 1993 addition of the Northstar System, including the Northstar quad-cam 32-valve aluminum V8 and a new unequal-length control arm rear suspension to the STS helped the Seville increase sales. The rear suspension previously featured a single transverse leaf spring like the Chevrolet Corvette.
The Seville was divided into two sub-models:
 The Seville Luxury Sedan (SLS) started with the 4.9 L HT-4900 V8 but got a  LD8 Northstar V8 for 1994
 The Seville Touring Sedan (STS) also started with the 4.9 L HT-4900 in 1992 but was upgraded to the  L37 Northstar in 1993

0–60 mph times were 7.4 seconds for the SLS and 6.9 seconds for the STS. Rain sensing wipers, called RainSense, were standard on the STS.
From 1994, both models were equipped with the GM 4T80 transmission but different final drive. There were model specific bumpers, side plastic molding and rear taillights. The STS models featured body color front grille, while the SLS models had a chrome plated grille and a Cadillac hood badge. On the inside, the STS models used more Zebrawood trim compared to the SLS. The seats in the STS models were covered with perforated leather in contrast with the non-perforated leather on the SLS. The SLS models could have been specified with the optional column shifter. The STS models featured Active suspension (CVRSS) while the SLS models were equipped with passive suspension. Both models were equipped with speed sensitive steering effort and rear pneumatic Self-levelling suspension, power antenna, soft close trunk lid and 2 driver memories for seats, rear view mirrors, climate control, and sound system settings.

As of 1994 model year, the Seville STS (and companion Eldorado ETC) became the most powerful front-wheel-drive cars on the market at 300 hp (224 kW).

For the 1996 production year, on both models, the interior was revised including seats, central console, shifter knob and door trim. Due to the 1996 OBDII compliance mandate most electronic modules were revised. Two sound system options were introduced, the base Delco Electronics and the optional BOSE, both sound systems featured AM/FM radio and tape player. Both could be connected to the optional trunk mounted 12 disk CD player and the optional cellular phone. The BOSE sound system included 4 amplifiers and added Digital signal processor (DSP) and Radio Data System (RDS). In some export markets the sound system was slightly different. Steering controls were standard for the climate control and the sound system. The exterior changes are minimal, for the STS models new 7 spoke 16" aluminum rims were introduced in silver finish and as an option in chrome finish. Depending on the tire options, the top speed was limited to 130 mph ("H" rated tires) or 156 mph ("Z" rated tires).

In 1997 some of the electronic modules were further updated for OBDII compliance reasons, a revised climate control module is introduced and there are updates to the stability system with the addition of a yaw sensor. Some of the advanced DIC self diagnostic features were removed requiring a TechII scanner tool instead. The TheftLock feature is added to the Head Unit (HU). The heated windshield option is no longer available for 1997.
Base prices for both models peaked in 1996 at US$42,995 for the SLS and US$47,495 for the STS but the increasingly competitive luxury car market resulted in price reductions for 1997. They were reduced to $39,995 for the SLS and $44,995 for the STS.

The Seville continued to move upmarket, in both size and price which lead to the Cadillac Catera taking its place as Cadillac's smallest car for 1997.

Production Figures:

Engines

Fifth generation (1998–2004) 

A redesigned Seville was introduced in late 1997 for 1998 MY, built on GM's G platform (which GM chose to continue to refer to as the K). All transverse engine front-wheel drive Sevilles were built in Hamtramck, Michigan.

The car looked quite similar to the fourth-generation model, but featured numerous suspension and drivability improvements. The Seville STS (and companion Eldorado ETC) continued being the most powerful front-wheel-drive cars on the market at 300 hp (224 kW). The top STS model ran 0–60 mph in 6.4 seconds and had a 14.8 second quarter-mile time.

The fifth-generation Seville was the first Cadillac engineered to be built in both left- and right-hand-drive form; and the first modern Cadillac to be officially sold in a right-hand-drive market (the United Kingdom). Models sold in Japan were left-hand drive. In the past, right-hand-drive Cadillacs were built from CKD kits or special conversion kits shipped for local conversion. An export version was produced with narrower bumpers to get under a 5-meter taxation length. The 1998 Seville was the first Cadillac launched with a European type approval number in Europe; the United Kingdom first, and then Germany, Belgium, France, Spain, Italy, Finland and other markets.

On the fifth generation Seville, the steering column was a power tilt and telescoping unit, whose operation was tied into the memory functions. However, the soft close trunk lid and power antenna was no longer available. The car's security system was now equipped with the Passlock III, an update for the resistor based Passlock II, which was updated from the previous generation. Also, updated from the previous generation was the car's the sound system. It added a head unit with radio, tape and CD player. The cellular phone option was still available, however the optional trunk mounted CD player was replaced with a 6 disc unit. Between 1998 and 1999 a first generation (non-touch screen) GPS navigation option was available. It was updated in 2000 with a larger touchscreen DVD-based GPS navigation unit.

In 1999 a one-year only (for the Seville) massage seats option was available. In 2000 the Tire-pressure monitoring system (TPMS) became available as an option. In January 2002 the STS received a new MagneRide adaptive suspension system, unavailable on the SLS, becoming the first production vehicle equipped standard with such suspension technology, far ahead of the exotic supercars.

Production of the Seville STS ended on May 16, 2003. Seville SLS production ended seven months later on December 4, 2003. In 2004, only the Seville SLS model was available for purchase. The Seville model name was discontinued for 2005 and replaced with the Cadillac STS.

Engines

US sales

References

Bibliography

External links

 Cadillac Seville Year by Year Changes

Seville
Front-wheel-drive vehicles
Full-size vehicles
Executive cars
Rear-wheel-drive vehicles
Mid-size cars
Sedans
1980s cars
1990s cars
2000s cars
Motor vehicles manufactured in the United States
Cars introduced in 1975